The term 'clothes horse' is used to refer to a portable frame upon which wet laundry is hung to dry by evaporation. The frame is usually made of wood, metal or plastic. It is a cheap low-tech piece of laundry equipment, as opposed to a clothes dryer, which requires electricity to operate, or a Hills Hoist, which requires ample space, wind and fine weather. It also served as an alternative to an airing cupboard. In cold, damp seasons and in the absence of central heating, a clothes horse placed by a fireside or a kitchen range provides a place to warm clothing before putting it on. The practice of airing, once ubiquitous in Great Britain, for example, in the constant battle against damp and mold, has become far less common with the advent of central heating and affordable clothes dryers.

Terminology
Other names for this device include a clothes rack, drying horse, clothes maiden, drying rack, scissor rack, drying stand, airer, or (Scots) Winter Dyke.

Types
There are many types of clothes horses: large, stationary outdoor ones; smaller, folding portable racks; and wall-mounted drying racks. A clothes horse is similar in usage and function to a clothes line, and used as an alternative to the powered clothes dryer. An electric alternative exists, usually known as a heated clothes airer.

An overhead clothes airer can be lowered by its pulley mechanism to a convenient height for loading the wet laundry, and then hoisted out of the way to ceiling height while the clothes dry.

Figurative usage
The term clothes horse can be used to describe men and women who are passionate about clothing and always appear in public dressed in the latest styles.  From 1850 the term referred to a male fop or female quaintrelle, a person whose main function is, or appears to be, to wear or show off clothes. In this context, the term is similar to "fashion plate", which originally referred to a lithograph illustration of fashionable clothing in a book or magazine.

Clothes horse can also be used to describe men or women who are employed primarily to display clothing. The term is often used pejoratively, for example to imply that an actor or actress has been cast in a role primarily to show off costumes rather than for their acting ability.

See also 
 Laundry-folding machine

References

Home
Laundry drying equipment
Domestic implements
English words and phrases